John Japp JP (1844–1911) was a leading Liverpool shipowner and local politician who served as Lord Mayor of Liverpool.

Biography
Japp was born in Montrose, Scotland. He was the son of Francis Japp, partner in the firm J. & F. Japp, Cabinetmakers. He arrived in Liverpool from Scotland in 1865 and by his energy, industry and mercantile abilities, he made his was into the front rank of the shipping community. He started business as a shipbroker and shipowner. He was a partner in the well known firm of Messrs Japp & Kirby, shipowners, brokers and merchants in Chapel Street, Liverpool.

He entered Liverpool City council as a Liberal in 1899 for Sefton Park East. He was noted for his special services rendered on the education authority, especially with regard to technical instruction in nautical subjects. He was also a Justice of the Peace.

He served as the 2nd Scottish in 1906-07 Lord Mayor of Liverpool. His Mayoral allowance was £2000.

His cousin was James William Japp, Provost of Montrose from 1878 to 1881.

See also
Records, sources & information about the Parish and Royal Burgh of Montrose
 1899 Liverpool City Council election
 Liverpool City Council elections 1880–present
 Liverpool City Council
 Mayors and Lord Mayors of Liverpool 1207 to present

References

Mayors of Liverpool
1844 births
1911 deaths